Guy Haimov (born 9 March 1986) is a former Israeli professional footballer who played as a goalkeeper.

Early life
Haimov was bor and raised in Holon, Israel, to a Bukharan-Jewish family.

Club career 
Haimov grew up playing for the Maccabi Tel Aviv youth systems . He was part of the youth team that won the 2003/2004 Youth Championship. Although he was a part of the senior squad for 3 seasons he never played a League match for Maccabi Tel Aviv but took part in Toto Cup matches.
 
Haimov made his league debut in a Premier League match against Hakoah Maccabi Amidar/Ramat Gan on 10 February 2007 for Hapoel Kfar Saba with which he spent 2 seasons on loan.

Haimov was back in Maccabi Tel Aviv after signing a 3-year contract.

On 8 August 2012, Haimov was loaned to AEK Larnaca from the Cypriot First Division.

International career 
In 2003, Haimov was part of the Israel U17 that participated at the 2003 UEFA European Under-17 Football Championship.

On September 6, 2011 Haimov made his senior international debut replacing injured Dudu Aouate at half time on Israel's EURO 2012 qualifier against Croatia in Zagreb he conceded 3 goals resulting in 3–1 loss.

Honours

Club
Hapoel Kiryat Shmona
Israel Super Cup (1): 2015

Hapoel Beer Sheva
 Israeli Premier League (2): 2016-17, 2017-18
Israel Super Cup (2): 2016, 2017
Toto Cup (1): 2016–17

See also 

 List of Jewish footballers
 List of Jews in sports
 List of Israelis

References

External links

1986 births
Living people
Israeli Jews
Israeli footballers
Israel international footballers
Hapoel Kfar Saba F.C. players
Maccabi Tel Aviv F.C. players
Hakoah Maccabi Amidar Ramat Gan F.C. players
Hapoel Ironi Kiryat Shmona F.C. players
AEK Larnaca FC players
Hapoel Be'er Sheva F.C. players
Maccabi Haifa F.C. players
Israeli expatriate footballers
Expatriate footballers in Cyprus
Israeli expatriate sportspeople in Cyprus
Israeli Premier League players
Liga Leumit players
Cypriot First Division players
Footballers from Holon
Association football goalkeepers